Mestognathidae is an extinct conodont family in the order Ozarkodinida.

Genera are Laterignathus and Mestognathus.

References

External links 

Ozarkodinida families